Events from the 1520s in England.

Incumbents
 Monarch – Henry VIII
 Regent – Thomas Howard, 2nd Duke of Norfolk (starting 31 May, until 16 July 1520)
 Parliament – Black (starting 15 April, until 13 August 1523), Reformation (starting 3 November 1529)

Events
 1520
 26–31 May – Charles V, Holy Roman Emperor visits King Henry VIII at Dover and Canterbury.
 7–24 June – King Henry VIII and King Francis I of France meet at the Field of the Cloth of Gold.
 1521
 17 May – Edward Stafford, 3rd Duke of Buckingham, is executed for treason.
 25 September – secret Treaty of Bruges signed by Emperor Charles V and Cardinal Wolsey agreeing to declare war on France in 1523.
 11 October – Pope Leo X bestows Henry VIII with the title Defender of the Faith for his work Assertio Septem Sacramentorum (The Assertion of the Seven Sacraments) attacking the teachings of Martin Luther.
 1522
 Late May – England presents an ultimatum to France and Scotland.
 19 June – Charles V visits England for six weeks and signs the Treaty of Windsor pledging a joint invasion of France, bringing England into the Italian War of 1521–1526. Henry VIII has the Round Table at Winchester Castle repainted with his own image for the visit.
 July – the English army attacks Brittany and Picardy from Calais, burning and looting the countryside.
 Muster rolls are compiled in the counties.
 1523
 April – Thomas More elected Speaker of the House of Commons.
 Thomas Howard raids Scotland, sacking Kelso and Jedburgh.
 Anthony Fitzherbert publishes , The Boke of Surveyinge and Improvements and The Boke of Husbandrie (the first work on agriculture published in England).
 1524
 25 May – Henry VIII and Charles V form an alliance to support Charles III, Duke of Bourbon in his dispute with Francis I of France.
 Henry VIII receives a "box of marmalade" from Mr Hull of Exeter.
 1525
 June – the Amicable Grant, a form of poll tax imposed without the consent of Parliament, abandoned.
 16 June – Henry VIII creates his 6-year old illegitimate son Henry Fitzroy Duke of Richmond and Somerset.
 July – Wolsey founds Cardinal College, Oxford.
 14 August – peace is agreed between England and France.
 24–25 December – English Reformation: Robert Barnes preaches an openly evangelical sermon at the church of St Edward King and Martyr, Cambridge, accusing the Catholic Church of heresy.
 William Tyndale's New Testament Bible translation into English is made but printing in Cologne is interrupted by anti-Lutheran forces.
 Hops first cultivated in Kent.
 1526 
 Spring – William Tyndale's English translation of the Bible reaches England, printing having been completed in Worms, Germany (with other copies being printed in Amsterdam). In October, Cuthbert Tunstall, Bishop of London, attempts to collect all the copies in his diocese and burn them.
 August–November – The first of several debasements of coinage, reducing the size of silver coins, and raising the value of the gold sovereign.
 c. September – German artist Hans Holbein the Younger begins a two-year stay in England.
 1527
 30 April – by the Treaty of Westminster, Cardinal Wolsey signs an alliance between England and France.
 17 May – Archbishop William Warham holds a secret inquiry into the legality of Henry's marriage to Catherine of Aragon.
 Bishop Vesey's Grammar School, Sutton Coldfield, is founded by John Vesey, Bishop of Exeter; and Sir George Monoux College, Walthamstow, is founded as a grammar school by Sir George Monoux, draper and Lord Mayor of London.
 1528
 22 January – Henry VIII and Francis I of France declare war on Emperor Charles V.
 March – trade suspended between England and the Netherlands because of the war with the Holy Roman Empire.
 end May – the fourth major outbreak of the sweating sickness appears in London, rapidly spreading to the rest of England.
 June – unrest in England caused by economic difficulties due to the war forces the government to seek a truce with the Empire.
 2 October – William Tyndale's The Obedience of a Christian Man (The Obedience of a Christen man, and how Christen rulers ought to govern) is printed in Antwerp for clandestine distribution in England.
 St George's Chapel, Windsor Castle, completed.
 The King's School, Ipswich, is founded by Cardinal Wolsey.
 1529
 May–July – Wolsey presides over a legatine court at Blackfriars, London to rule on the legality of Henry's marriage to Catherine of Aragon.
 27 August – Henry VIII accedes to the Treaty of Cambrai.
 26 October – Cardinal Wolsey falls from power due to his failure to prevent Habsburg expansion in Europe and obtain a divorce for Henry VIII. Thomas More succeeds him as Lord Chancellor.
 4 November–17 December – first sitting of the Reformation Parliament.
 Aylesbury is made the county town of Buckinghamshire by the King.

Births
 1520
 13 September – William Cecil, 1st Baron Burghley, statesman (died 1598)
 1521
Anne Askew, Protestant martyr (died 1546)
John Aylmer, divine (died 1594)
 Thomas Chaloner, statesman and poet (died 1565)
 Philippe de Monte, composer (died 1603)
Thomas Wyatt the younger, rebel (died 1554)
 1522
 24 May – John Jewel, bishop (died 1571)
 1524
Thomas Tusser, poet and farmer (died 1580)
 1525
 25 March – Richard Edwardes, choral musician, playwright and poet (died 1566)
 25 September – Steven Borough, explorer (died 1584)
 Edward Sutton, 4th Baron Dudley (died 1586)
 1526
 4 March – Henry Carey, 1st Baron Hunsdon (died 1596)
 23 September – Henry Manners, 2nd Earl of Rutland, Lord Lieutenant of Nottinghamshire (died 1563)
 1527
 28 March – Isabella Markham, courtier (died 1579)
 13 July – John Dee, mathematician, astronomer, and geographer (died 1608)
 Lawrence Humphrey, clergyman and educator (died 1590)
 1528
George Talbot, 6th Earl of Shrewsbury, statesman (died 1590)
 John Dudley, 2nd Earl of Warwick (died 1554)
 1529
Henry Sidney, lord deputy of Ireland (died 1586)

Deaths
 1521
 17 May – Edward Stafford, 3rd Duke of Buckingham (executed) (born 1478)
 22 October – Edward Poyning, Lord Deputy to King Henry VII of England (born 1459)
 1522
 25 February – William Lilye, classical scholar (born c. 1468)
 6 April – Henry Stafford, 1st Earl of Wiltshire, nobleman (born 1479)
 1523
 24 May – Henry Marney, 1st Baron Marney, politician (born 1447)
 October – William Cornysh, composer (born 1465)
 Stephen Hawes, poet (born 1502)
 1524
 21 May – Thomas Howard, 2nd Duke of Norfolk, soldier and statesman (born 1443)
 24 August – William Scott of Scott's Hall, Lord Warden of the Cinque Ports (year of birth unknown)
 20 December – Thomas Linacre, humanist and physician (born 1460)
 1525
 24 February – Richard de la Pole, last Yorkist claimant to the throne (killed in battle) (year of birth unknown)
 22 July – Richard Wingfield, diplomat (born c. 1456)
 1526
 1 February – Charles Somerset, 1st Earl of Worcester (born 1460)
 1527
 May – Thomas Docwra, Grand Prior of the Knights Hospitaller (born 1458)
 15 November – Catherine of York, aunt of Henry VIII (born 1479)
 Jane Shore, mistress of King Edward IV of England (born c. 1445)
 1528
 5 October – Richard Foxe, churchman (born c. 1448)
 1529
 21 June – John Skelton, English poet (born c. 1460)
 c. December – Richard Pynson, printer (born c. 1449 in Normandy)

References